Sånger om oss is a 2010 Lisa Nilsson compilation album.

Track listing
I samma andetag
Regn i rio
Allt jag behöver
Mysteriet deg
Wave
Viola
Vad du ser är vad du får
It's Easy
Varje gång jag ser dig
Du (öppnar min värld)
Långsamt farväl
Himlen runt hörnet
Handens fem fingar
Små rum
Tror på dig (with Stephen Simmonds)
Säg det igen
En kort en lång
Unforgettable (live, with Danmarks Radios Underholdningsorkestret)

Charts

Weekly charts

Year-end charts

References

2010 compilation albums
Compilation albums by Swedish artists
Lisa Nilsson albums